Harry Rubin (born June 23, 1926 in New York City) – February 2, 2020) was an American cell biologist and virologist. He is known for his experimental research on oncoviruses and how cellular microenvironment and cellular aging affect the regulation of cancerous tumors.

Biography
His parents were Jewish immigrants and his father had a grocery store and delicatessen in Manhattan. Harry Rubin graduated in 1947 as a Doctor of Veterinary Medicine (D.V.M.) from the New York State College of Veterinary Medicine at Cornell University. From 1947 to 1948 he served in the joint U.S.-Mexican Aftosa Commission dealing with an outbreak of hoof-and-mouth disease (fiebre aftosa in Spanish) among cattle in Mexico. From 1948 to 1952 he was stationed in Montgomery, Alabama as a commissioned officer of the United States Public Health Service. In January 1952 he married Dorothy Margaret Shuster, who was being trained as a flight evacuation nurse in the U.S. Air Force when he met her.

In 1952 he was briefly enrolled as a graduate student at New York University, but Wendell Stanley recruited him to work at UC Berkeley's Virus Laboratory. From 1952 to 1953 Rubin was a research fellow at UC Berkeley. From 1953 to 1958 he was a research fellow at Caltech. There he worked in Renato Dulbecco's laboratory and discovered in 1955 that, in a tumor infected with Rous sarcoma virus (RSV), every cell in the tumor is capable of releasing RSV. In 1958 Temin and Rubin published an important paper Characteristics of an assay for Rous sarcoma virus and Rous sarcoma cells in tissue culture on their breakthrough in developing a tissue culture assay for RSV. At UC Berkeley, Rubin was an associate professor from 1958 to 1960 and a full professor from 1960 to 2001, when he retired as professor emeritus.

At UC Berkeley's Virus Laboratory, Rubin, working with postdoctoral fellows, Peter K. Vogt and Hidesaburo Hanafusa, demonstrated that avian sarcoma leukosis virus (ASLV) can act as a "helper virus" for RSV. This research earned Rubin the 1964 Albert Lasker Award for Basic Medical Research (shared with Renato Dulbecco).

Rubin received in 1961 the Eli Lilly Award in Bacteriology and Immunology and in 1963 the Merck Research Award. He was elected in 1978 a member of the United States National Academy of Sciences.

He was "a singer and guitar player much in demand at parties." During the 1960s he was active in Berkeley's anti-Vietnam war movement. In the 1970s he became interested in Jewish ethics and the ideas of some Jewish philosophers such as Emmanuel Levinas, Franz Rosenzweig, Joseph B. Soloveitchik, and Eliezer Berkovits. Rubin and his wife joined the Congregation Beth Israel in Berkeley, and he met regularly with a philosophy discussion group of congregation members.

His doctoral students include Howard M. Temin and Gail R. Martin.

Harry and Dorothy Rubin had two sons and two daughters. Upon his death after 68 years of marriage, he was survived by his widow, two sons, one daughter, six grandchildren, and seven great-grandchildren. His grave is in Gan Shalom Cemetery, Contra Costa County, California.

Selected publications

References

1926 births
2020 deaths
American veterinarians
American virologists
Cancer researchers
Jewish American scientists
Cornell University alumni
University of California, Berkeley faculty
Recipients of the Albert Lasker Award for Basic Medical Research
Members of the United States National Academy of Sciences
California Institute of Technology fellows